Richard Göran Emil Magyar (born 3 May 1991) is a Swedish former professional footballer who played as a centre-back. 

In a 12-year career, he represented and captained both Halmstads BK and Hammarby IF in Allsvenskan, also spending time abroad with FC Aarau and Greuther Fürth.

Early life
Magyar's father is of Hungarian descent. He started his career with local club Åkarps IF at the age of 8, followed by a moved to GoIF Nike. At the age of 15 he went on trial with Malmö FF but eventually signed for Lunds BK in 2006. A year later, his family moved to Halmstad, where he signed for BK Astrio. In 2008, he moved to local rival Halmstads BK, spending only a year in the youth squad and was also part the team that won the first edition of the U21 Allsvenskan championship in 2009.

Career

Halmstads BK
Prior to the 2010 season, Magyar was promoted to Halmstad BK's senior squad as a trainee. After sitting on the bench for several games, he made his debut in Allsvenskan on 5 May for Halmstads BK against Kalmar FF, at age 19, starting as teammate Tomas Žvirgždauskas had picked up an injury.

In 2011, Magyar was used as a fringe starter for Halmstad, making 22 league appearances, as the club finished at the foot of the Allsvenskan table and suffered a relegation. Playing in the second tier Superettan in 2012, Magyar made 27 appearances under manager Jens Gustafsson and led his side to a third place in the table, which meant that Halmstad advanced to a promotion play-off to Allsvenskan where they eliminated GIF Sundsvall by 6–4 on aggregate.

In 2013, Magyar made 29 appearances in Allsvenskan, scoring once, as the club finished 14th in the table. Once again, Halmstad eliminated GIF Sundsvall in the relegation play-offs. Before the 2014 season, following the retirement of Stefan Selaković, Magyar was appointed as the new team captain at Halmstad. Halmstad finished 10th in the Allsvenskan table, but Magyar decided to leave the club when his contract expired, making 106 senior appearances in total.

FC Aarau
On 17 January 2015, Magyar signed a two and a half-year deal with FC Aarau. At his new club, Magyar teamed up with another former player of Halmstad, midfielder Dusan Djuric. He eventually played six league games during the spring of 2015, but was unable to prevent Aarau from getting relegated from the Swiss Super League. Activating a clause, Magyar was released from his contract at the end of the season.

Hammarby IF
On 7 July 2015, Magyar returned to Sweden and signed a two-year deal with newly promoted club Hammarby IF. He went on to make 11 league appearances during the second half of the Allsvenskan season, pairing up with Lars Sætra in the central defence, as the side finished 11th in the table.

In 2016, Magyar begun the campaign as a starter, but lost his place in favour of Joseph Aidoo and David Boo Wiklander. He made 20 league appearances, as Hammarby finished 11th in the table for a second consecutive season.

In 2017, Magyar flourished under new manager Jakob Michelsen and started in all of the first ten rounds of the Allsvenskan campaign. On 5 June 2017, when his contract expired, it was announced that Magyar would leave Hammarby, in spite of being offered a new deal by the club.

Greuther Fürth
On 5 June 2017, Magyar joined 2. Bundesliga side SpVgg Greuther Fürth on a two-year contract. He played 47 games for the club, scoring four goals, across two seasons.

Return to Hammarby
On 11 July 2019, Magyar returned to his former club Hammarby IF, signing a three-year contract. Forming a defensive partnership with Mads Fenger, Magyar helped Hammarby to a 3rd place in the 2019 Allsvenskan table, after eight straight wins at the end of the season.

On 30 May 2021, Magyar won the 2020–21 Svenska Cupen, the main domestic cup, with Hammarby through a 5–4 win on penalties (0–0 after full-time) against BK Häcken in the final.

On 2 April 2022, Magyar was appointed as the new club captain of Hammarby by head coach Martí Cifuentes. On 22 July 2022, it was announced that Magyar would be sidelined for at least a few months due to a foot injury. On 27 November 2022, Magyar announced that he would retire from professional football with immediate effect.

International career
In May 2011, Magyar was for the first time summoned to the Swedish U21 team. However, an injury forced Magyar to miss out. Marcus Törnstrand was called up to replace Magyar.

Career statistics

Honours
Hammarby IF
 Svenska Cupen: 2020–21

References

External links
 
 HBK Profile 

1991 births
Living people
Swedish people of Hungarian descent
Footballers from Malmö
Association football defenders
Swedish footballers
Sweden youth international footballers
Sweden under-21 international footballers
Swedish expatriate footballers
Expatriate footballers in Switzerland
Allsvenskan players
Superettan players
Swiss Super League players
2. Bundesliga players
Regionalliga players
Halmstads BK players
FC Aarau players
Hammarby Fotboll players
SpVgg Greuther Fürth players
SpVgg Greuther Fürth II players